Regan Edward Ware (born 7 August 1994) is a New Zealand rugby sevens and rugby union player. He debuted for New Zealand at the 2015 Dubai Sevens tournament. Ware was selected for the New Zealand squad for the 2016 Summer Olympics in Rio de Janeiro, Brazil. Of Māori descent, Ware affiliates to the Ngāti Korokī Kahukura and Ngāti Porou iwi.

Ware was part of the All Blacks Sevens squad that won a bronze medal at the 2022 Commonwealth Games in Birmingham. He competed at the Rugby World Cup Sevens in Cape Town. He won a silver medal after his side lost to Fiji in the gold medal final.

Tasman
Ware was named as a late signing for  during the 2021 Bunnings NPC after a season ending injury to Mark Telea. He made his debut for Tasman in Round 5 of the competition against  at Lansdowne Park, coming off the bench and scoring a try in a 51–14 win for the Mako.

References

External links
 
 
 
 
 

Living people
New Zealand international rugby sevens players
Rugby sevens players at the 2016 Summer Olympics
Olympic rugby sevens players of New Zealand
1994 births
Waikato rugby union players
New Zealand rugby union players
Rugby union players from Tokoroa
Rugby union wings
New Zealand male rugby sevens players
Ngāti Porou people
Bay of Plenty rugby union players
Rugby sevens players at the 2018 Commonwealth Games
Commonwealth Games rugby sevens players of New Zealand
Commonwealth Games gold medallists for New Zealand
Commonwealth Games medallists in rugby sevens
Ngāti Korokī Kahukura people
Rugby sevens players at the 2020 Summer Olympics
Olympic medalists in rugby sevens
Olympic silver medalists for New Zealand
Medalists at the 2020 Summer Olympics
Taranaki rugby union players
Tasman rugby union players
Māori All Blacks players
Rugby union centres
Rugby sevens players at the 2022 Commonwealth Games
Medallists at the 2018 Commonwealth Games
Medallists at the 2022 Commonwealth Games